Amphoroidea falcifer is an isopod of the family Sphaeromatidae, endemic to New Zealand.

References

Sphaeromatidae
Marine crustaceans of New Zealand
Crustaceans described in 1879